The 1977–78 NCAA Division I men's ice hockey season began in October 1977 and concluded with the 1978 NCAA Division I Men's Ice Hockey Tournament's championship game on March 25, 1978 at the Providence Civic Center in Providence, Rhode Island. This was the 31st season in which an NCAA ice hockey championship was held and is the 84th year overall where an NCAA school fielded a team.

Regular season

Season tournaments

Standings

1978 NCAA Tournament

Player stats

Scoring leaders
The following players led the league in points at the conclusion of the season.

  
GP = Games played; G = Goals; A = Assists; Pts = Points; PIM = Penalty minutes

Leading goaltenders
The following goaltenders led the league in goals against average at the end of the regular season while playing at least 33% of their team's total minutes.

GP = Games played; Min = Minutes played; W = Wins; L = Losses; OT = Overtime/shootout losses; GA = Goals against; SO = Shutouts; SV% = Save percentage; GAA = Goals against average

Awards

NCAA

CCHA

ECAC

WCHA

See also
 1977–78 NCAA Division II men's ice hockey season
 1977–78 NCAA Division III men's ice hockey season

References

External links
College Hockey Historical Archives
1977–78 NCAA Standings

 
NCAA